A UCI WorldTeam (2015–present), previously UCI ProTeam (2005–2014), is the term used by the Union Cycliste Internationale (UCI) to name a cycling team of the highest category in professional road cycling, the UCI World Tour or UCI ProTour, respectively.

List of teams

2011

2012

2013

2014

2015

2016

The 18 WorldTeams in 2016 were:

2017

The 18 WorldTeams in 2017 were:

2018

The 18 WorldTeams in 2018 are:

2019

The 18 WorldTeams in 2019 are:

2020

The 19 WorldTeams in 2020 are:

2021

The 19 WorldTeams in 2021 are:

2022

History of UCI WorldTeams 
Dark grey indicates that the team was not operating in the year in question. Light blue indicates that the team was competing at a lower level in the year in question.

References

 
Men's cycling teams

Teams